Bombyx mandarina, the wild silk moth, is an insect from the moth family Bombycidae. It is the closest relative of Bombyx mori, the domesticated silk moth. The silkworm is the larva or caterpillar of a silk moth. Unlike the domesticated relative which is unable to fly or indeed persist outside human care, the wild silk moth is a fairly ordinary lepidopteran. Its main difference from the domesticated taxon is the more slender body with well-developed wings in males, and the dull greyish-brown colour.

Phylogeny and systematics
Bombyx mandarina and the domesticated Bombyx mori constitute two of the currently identified eight species of the genus Bombyx, the true or mulberry silk moths. The origin of the domestic silk moth is enigmatic. It has been suggested that it is the survivor of an extinct species which diverged from the ancestors of Bombyx mandarina millions of years ago. However, this is based on an untenable molecular clock hypothesis that assumes that wild and domestic silk moths evolved equally fast after their lineages diverged. Rather, the effects of artificial selection have accelerated evolution in the domestic form to a point where it is hard to trace the origin of the numerous breeds of domestic silk moths even with the most modern molecular phylogeny methods. Conceivably, today's domestic silk moths are all descended from an initial stock of B. mandarina collected as far back as 5,000 years ago. While wild silk could have been collected and used as threads, etc., since much earlier, the technology to breed and use silkworms from a domesticated stock did not exist before the late Neolithic.

However, it has been possible to trace the geographical origin of the domestic silk moth. The wild species occurs over a considerable range from inland China to Korea and Japan, and shows much (albeit subtle) variation; Chinese specimens have 56 chromosomes and Japanese specimens have 54. The populations from the northeastern end of the range, for example, differ in karyotype from those of inland China. Domestic silk moths are closer to the latter regarding mtDNA sequence data, and especially lack some genetic apomorphies of the northeastern B. mandarina. Thus, the initial domestic stock came from inland China.<ref>{{cite journal |doi-access=free|doi=10.1093/oxfordjournals.molbev.a004200|title=Significant levels of sequence divergence and gene rearrangements have occurred between the mitochondrial genomes of the wild mulberry silkmoth, Bombyx mandarina, and its close relative, the domesticated silkmoth, Bombyx mori |year=2002|last1=Yukuhiro|first1=Kenji|last2=Sezutsu|first2=Hideki|last3=Itoh|first3=Masanobu|last4=Shimizu|first4=Koichi|last5=Banno|first5=Yutaka|journal=Molecular Biology and Evolution|volume=19|issue=8|pages=1385–1389|pmid=12140251}}</ref>B. mandarina is able to hybridize with B. mori. Both in the wild and in a domesticated environment, females release pheromones and wait for males to be attracted and fly to them. However, B. mori males cannot fly. Hybridisation in the wild, therefore, inevitably means breeding between wild (B. mandarina) males and domestic (B. mori) females. Hybridization is possible in both directions in a domesticated environment.

Consequently, the two silk moths have been united as subspecies of a single species; in this case, the name Bombyx mori, which was published first, applies for both. However, today it is usually recognized that the domestic silk moth is entirely dependent on human care for its survival and thus has a level of reproductive isolation from its wild relatives.

References

External links
 Japanese Moths: Bombyx mandarina''. Contains many photos. Retrieved 18 July 2007.
Copulation between female B. mandarina (left) and male B. mori in captivity. Note stunted wings of male. Retrieved 18 July 2007.

Bombycidae
Moths described in 1872
Moths of Japan